Stoczek Łukowski  is a town in eastern Poland with 2,556 inhabitants. Situated in Łuków County (the Lublin Voivodeship). The town is located upon the Świder River.

Stoczek Łukowski belongs to the historic province of Mazovia, in which it was part of the Land of Czersk. In the 15th century, it was property of Bishops of Poznań, and was named "Wola Poznańska". In the 16th century documents, it was also called "Sebastianowo", probably after Bishop of Poznań Sebastian Branicki. Current name came into use in the 17th century.

History 
Stoczek Lukowski was first mentioned in the 13th century. On 4 April 1546, it was granted town charter by King Zygmunt Stary. Since 1815, the town belonged to Russian-controlled Congress Poland, here the Battle of Stoczek took place on 14 February 1831. On 18 January 1849, Aleksander Świętochowski was born in Stoczek. Another famous person born here is Bishop Adolf Piotr Szelążek.

Stoczek was one of main centers of the January Uprising, for which in 1867 it was stripped of town charter, and remained a village until 1916.

 XIII century -first mention about Stoczek

Notable residents
Aleksander Świętochowski (1849–1938), writer, educator, and philosopher

References

External links 
 Official town website and English version of this site

Cities and towns in Lublin Voivodeship
Łuków County
Masovian Voivodeship (1526–1795)
Siedlce Governorate
Lublin Governorate
Lublin Voivodeship (1919–1939)